Stephen D. Lebovitz (born c. 1962) is an American businessman. He serves as the chief executive officer and president of CBL & Associates Properties.

Early life
Stephen D. Lebovitz was born circa 1962. His father, Charles B. Lebovitz, was a co-founder of CBL & Associates Properties, and served as its chairman.

Lebovitz graduated from Stanford University, where he earned a bachelor of arts degree in Political Science. He earned a master in business administration from the Harvard Business School in 1988.

Career
Lebovitz began his career at Goldman Sachs, where he worked from 1984 to 1986.

Lebovitz joined his family business, CBL & Associates Properties, in 1988. He was appointed as its president in 1999 and as its chief executive officer in 2010. He served as the chairman of the International Council of Shopping Centers from 2015 to 2016.

Personal life
Lebovitz has a wife, Lisa, and four children. They reside in Weston, Massachusetts.

References

Living people
People from Weston, Massachusetts
Stanford University alumni
Harvard Business School alumni
Businesspeople from Massachusetts
Goldman Sachs people
American chief executives
Year of birth missing (living people)